An Act to amend the Criminal Code (hate propaganda), also known as Bill C-250 during the second and third sessions of the 37th Canadian parliament, originated in a Canadian Private Member's Bill to amend the Criminal Code. It added penalties for publicly inciting hatred against or encouraging the genocide of people on the basis of sexual orientation and added a defence for the expression of good-faith opinions based on religious texts.

Content
Prior to this amendment, the Criminal Code prohibited the promotion of genocide and the public incitement of hatred against groups identifiable by colour, race, religion, and ethnic origin. The Act expanded coverage of these existing provisions to include groups identifiable on the basis of sexual orientation.  The Act also expanded one of the defences available to persons charged with the incitement of hatred, allowing for the expression of good-faith opinions based on religious texts, in addition to the preexisting defence allowing the good-faith expression of opinions on religious subjects.

Legislative history
C-250 was first introduced in 2001 into the 37th Parliament, 1st Session as Bill C-415 by New Democratic MP Svend Robinson.  Following the end of that session, the bill was reintroduced as C-250 in the 37th Parliament, 2nd Session.  It passed the House of Commons on September 17, 2003, but was not passed by the Senate before the end of the session.  The bill was again reintroduced in the 37th Parliament, 3rd Session, passing both the House and Senate.  Royal Assent was granted on April 29, 2004.

a. These senators have decided against joining the Conservative Party of Canada and have chosen to sit in the Senate as 'Progressive Conservatives' (with Mira Spivak briefly joining the Conservative caucus before becoming an Independent).

As with all Canadian legislation, this act has equal force in French in which it is called La Loi modifiant le Code criminel (propagande haineuse).

Religious freedom concerns
Critics of the bill claimed that it would prohibit reciting various scripture condemning homosexuality, while supporters pointed out that the bill added an explicit defence against any charge of incitement of hatred for opinions expressed in good faith based on religious texts. Critics of the law however, have expressed concern the courts will abrogate the religious loophole because "good faith" is not clearly defined.

References

External links 
 Text of Bill C-250, in English and French
 Criminal Code, sec 318
 Criminal Code, sec 319
 Criminal Code, sec 320
 Criminal Code, sec 320.1

Canadian federal legislation
LGBT law in Canada
37th Canadian Parliament
2003 in LGBT history
Canadian criminal law
2003 in Canadian law